Bert Ira Gordon (September 24, 1922 – March 8, 2023) was an American filmmaker and visual effects artist. He is best known for writing and directing science fiction and horror B-movies such as King Dinosaur (1955), The Amazing Colossal Man (1957), Earth vs. the Spider (1958), Village of the Giants (1965), and Empire of the Ants (1977). 

Most of Gordon's work is in the idiom of giant monster films, for which he used rear-projection to create the special effects. He was nicknamed "Mr. B.I.G." by Forrest J Ackerman, a reference to both his initials and his films' tendency to feature super-sized creatures.

Career
Gordon was born in Kenosha, Wisconsin, on September 24, 1922, and began making home movies in 16mm after his aunt gave him a camera for his 13th birthday. He dropped out of college to join the Army Air Forces in World War II. After the war, he married and he and his wife began making television commercials. He later edited British feature films to fit half-hour time slots and became a production assistant on Racket Squad and camera man on Serpent Island (1954).

In 1955, Gordon made his first feature, King Dinosaur, followed by The Cyclops in 1957, which co-starred Lon Chaney Jr. and Gloria Talbot. In 1957, he began his prolific association with American International Pictures, beginning with The Amazing Colossal Man and its 1958 sequel, War of the Colossal Beast. AIP distributed some of his other late-50s opuses, such as Earth vs the Spider, Beginning of the End (featuring Peter Graves), and Attack of the Puppet People.

In October 1960 Gordon sued AIP for fraud over four films they made together.

After filming Tormented (1960), he wrote, produced and directed The Boy and the Pirates, starring active and popular child star of the time Charles Herbert and Gordon's own daughter, Susan Gordon (who died in 2011 from thyroid cancer). All three appeared together in the celebrity lineup at the 2006 Monster Bash, held June 23–25 at the Pittsburgh International Airport Four Points Hotel. Sony Pictures Home Entertainment released a Midnite Movies double DVD set with the rarely seen The Boy and the Pirates, and Crystalstone (1987), on June 27, 2006.

Gordon held a degree from the University of Wisconsin–Madison.

In 2012, he hosted and moderated a screening of The Amazing Colossal Man in Dallas, Texas.

Personal life and death
Gordon was married from 1945 to 1979 to Flora Lang (1925–2016); the two divorced in 1979. They had three daughters: Susan (who predeceased her parents), Carol, and Patricia. Gordon had a fourth daughter, Christina, with his second wife, Eva.

Gordon died in Los Angeles on March 8, 2023, at the age of 100.

Filmography
As director-producer. Source for credits, years and primary titles:

Legacy
Of these titles, King Dinosaur, The Amazing Colossal Man, Earth Vs. The Spider, War of the Colossal Beast, The Magic Sword, Tormented, Beginning of the End, and Village of the Giants were featured on the film-spoofing series Mystery Science Theater 3000. Later, Attack of the Puppet People was featured on the spin-off to MST3K, Rifftrax, as was a redux of The Magic Sword.

See also
Ed Wood
Coleman Francis
Roger Corman

References

External links

 
Richard Brody's review of War of the Colossal Beast

1922 births
2023 deaths
American centenarians
American male screenwriters
Film directors from Wisconsin
Film producers from Wisconsin
Horror film directors
Horror film producers
Men centenarians
People from Kenosha, Wisconsin
Science fiction film directors
Screenwriters from Wisconsin
Special effects people
United States Army Air Forces personnel of World War II
University of Wisconsin–Madison alumni